Middle Cove may refer to:

 Middle Cove, New South Wales, Australia
 Middle Cove, Newfoundland and Labrador, Canada